Clanculus minor is a species of sea snail, a marine gastropod mollusk in the family Trochidae, the top snails.

Description
The height of the shell attains 5 mm. The small shell has a conical shape. It is white with radial reddish-brown strokes. The whorls are plane with transverse granulated cinguli. The body whorl is angulate. The base of the shell is flat. The umbilical margin is crenulate. The columella terminates in a bent tubercle. The inner lip is ridged.

Distribution
This marine species occurs in the Indian Ocean off Réunion.

References

 Arthur Adams (1853), Descriptions of new species of Trochidae; The Annals and Magazine of natural history; zoology, botany, 2nd ser. v. 12

External links
 To World Register of Marine Species
 

minor
Gastropods described in 1863